Riversdale may refer to:

Riversdale, Colchester County, Canada
Riversdale, Goulburn, a heritage-listed house in Goulburn, New South Wales, Australia
Riversdale, Jamaica, a village in the parish of Saint Catherine
Riversdale (Riverdale Park, Maryland), National Historic Landmark whose property became the foundation for the University of Maryland
Riversdale Mining, an Australian business with mines in Africa
Riversdale, New Zealand, a small town in Southland, New Zealand
Riversdale, Queensland, Australia
Riversdale railway station, Melbourne, Australia
Riversdale, Rathfarnham, Ireland, the last home of William Butler Yeats
Riversdale, Region of Queens Municipality, Canada
Riversdale, Saskatchewan, neighbourhood in the city of Saskatoon, Saskatchewan, Canada
Riversdale, Western Cape, a town in South Africa

See also 
Riverdale (disambiguation)